Ferropolis, "the city of iron", is an open-air museum of huge mid-20th century industrial machines in Gräfenhainichen, a city between Wittenberg and Dessau, Germany. These can measure up to 30 meters high and 120 meters long, and weigh up to 1,980 tons. The area is also used for several events such as opera performances or music festivals, including the Splash! Festival, Melt! Festival, and the "Ferropolis in Flammen" ("Ferropolis in flames") festival.

History
The museum is located on the site of a former strip mining operation. The minister of finance of the Saxony-Anhalt formally created the project on 14 December 1995. In December 2005, the museum was integrated into the "European Route of Industrial Heritage".

Gallery

External links

 Ferropolis (German)
 The Guardian about Ferropolis

Open-air museums in Germany
Museums established in 1995
Industry museums in Germany
Museums in Saxony-Anhalt
Mining museums in Germany
Mining in Saxony-Anhalt